Orphan X is a 2016 thriller novel written by Gregg Hurwitz. It is the first in a seven-book series of the same name from publisher Minotaur Books with the film rights belonging to Warner Bros.

The follow-up books in the series are "Buy a Bullet" (A short story released as an e-book in 2016), "The Nowhere Man" (Released in January 2017) and "Hellbent" (released in 2018). The fourth full-length book in the series, "Out of the Dark", arrived on January, 29, 2019. The fifth was "Into The Fire", and was released 28 January 2020. The sixth installment in the series, "The Prodigal Son", came out in February 2021.

Plot
The book centers around the character Evan Smoak. At the age of 12, he was enrolled in a top-secret operation known as the "Orphan Program." He is the 24th recruit in the program and is known only as Orphan X. The goal of the program is to train orphans so they can be assassins for government agencies. The program is shut down but Orphan X maintains access to the program's funding and weapons.

In his 30s, Smoak begins freelancing as an assassin, using his skills to fight corruption in the form of vigilante justice. For each person he helps, he tells them to pay it forward by giving someone in need of help his phone number. During his adventures, he discovers that former Orphan agents have also begun freelancing and are trying to assassinate him.

Reception
The Washington Post compared Orphan X to the beginning of a Bourne like book series, referring to it as a "smart, stylish, state-of-the-art thriller." Author Robert Crais stated that "a new thriller superstar is born" and novelist David Baldacci was quoted as saying "read this book...you will thank me." The Associated Press stated that Hurwitz "delivers a masterpiece of suspense and thrills...that invokes the best of “Batman,” ”The Bourne Identity” and “The Equalizer” films." Orphan X became an international bestseller, making lists such as the USA Today, The Boston Globe, New Zealand, and Australia.

Film and television adaptation
Prior to the release of Orphan X, Warner Bros. purchased the film rights.  22nd & Green, the production company owned by Bradley Cooper and Todd Phillips was linked to the film. Hurwitz was also said to be the writer for the movie adaptation. Warner Bros. recently allowed the rights to expire.

Brad Weston’s Makeready has landed the rights to the Orphan X book series with plans to adapt the thrillers into a television series along with Justin Lin’s Perfect Storm Entertainment.

References

External links
 

2016 American novels
American thriller novels
Books by Gregg Hurwitz
Minotaur Books books